Calgary Centre was a provincial electoral district in Alberta, Canada, mandated to return a single member to the Legislative Assembly of Alberta using the first past the post method of voting from 1959 to 1971.

History
The original Centre Calgary district was first created during a brief period when the Calgary riding was split three ways. The other two districts were Calgary South and Calgary North.

The second incarnation was during the re-distribution of 1959 when Alberta moved from Single Transferable Vote to First Past the Post.

The riding was last contested in the 1967 Alberta general election, after which the Alberta Legislature passed the 1970 An Act to amend The Election Act and The Legislative Assembly Act to redraw provincial electoral districts. Calgary Centre and Calgary Victoria Park were split between Calgary-Buffalo, Calgary-Mountain View, Calgary-Bow, Calgary-Millican and Calgary-North Hill.

The riding covered the Downtown Calgary.

1959 Redistribution
The historic 1959 redistribution of the provincial ridings of Calgary and Edmonton marked the transition back to First Past the Post. From 1926 to 1959 Calgary and Edmonton, elected members with Single Transferable Vote. The rest of the province had an option of how to count ballots to elect members in single seat ridings.

The redistribution created seven ridings in Calgary, two of those still exist today. Calgary and Edmonton were becoming too large to be a single riding.

The other six ridings were Calgary Bowness, Calgary West, Calgary Glenmore, Calgary North, Calgary North East, Calgary South East.

Members of the Legislative Assembly (MLAs)

Election results

1959 general election

1963 general election

1967 general election

See also
List of Alberta provincial electoral districts
Calgary Centre, an active federal electoral district
Centre Calgary, a defunct provincial electoral district from 1913 to 1921

References

Further reading

External links
Elections Alberta
The Legislative Assembly of Alberta

Former provincial electoral districts of Alberta
Politics of Calgary